Hyposmocoma trivitella is a species of moth of the family Cosmopterigidae. It was first described by Otto Swezey in 1913. It is endemic to the Hawaiian island of Kauai. The type locality is Haleakalā.

Adults have strong white, brown and magenta longitudinal bands on the forewing.

The larvae feed on Elaphoglossum reticulatum and Elapkoglossum gorgoneum. The larvae mine the leaves of their host plant, resulting in a blotch mine.

Original description of larva and pupa

Taxonomy
There is an error in the construction of the specific name. Dr. Swezey meant to refer to the three vittae on the forewings, which he mentioned in his original description, and the name should have been spelled trivittella. It was originally spelled trivitella, which would refer to "three lives", and the name would have no meaning in this instance.

External links

Species information

trivitella
Endemic moths of Hawaii
Moths described in 1913